Rasmus Grønborg Hansen (born April 9, 1986) is a retired Danish professional football defensive midfielder.

After retiring
After retiring at the end of the 2016/17 season, Hansen took an education in sports management and later worked in a company that assists in the recruitment of coaches. On 21 June 2019, he was hired as talent manager at Akademisk Boldklub.

External links
Akademisk Boldklub profile
National team profile
Career statistics at Danmarks Radio

References 

1986 births
Living people
Danish men's footballers
Denmark under-21 international footballers
Denmark youth international footballers
IF Midtdjurs players
FC Midtjylland players
Randers FC players
SønderjyskE Fodbold players
Vejle Boldklub players
Hobro IK players
Akademisk Boldklub players
Danish Superliga players
Danish 1st Division players
Association football defenders
Association football midfielders